Jacques Hnizdovsky, (1915–1985) was a Ukrainian-American painter, printmaker, graphic designer, illustrator and sculptor.

Biography 

Jacques Hnizdovsky was born on January 27, 1915, in Ukraine in what is now Chortkiv Raion of Ternopil Oblast to a noble family bearing the Korab coat of arms. He was the youngest of seven children and the only member of his family that was able to emigrate to the west.

He began his fine arts studies at the Academy of Fine Arts in Warsaw. Germany's invasion of Poland and bombardment of Warsaw forced Jacques to flee Warsaw and continue his studies at the Academy of Fine Arts in Zagreb. He was classically trained and had a great interest in portraiture, but Hnizdovsky was entirely self-taught in the art of printmaking.

Hnizdovsky created hundreds of paintings, pen and ink drawings and watercolors, as well as over 377 woodcuts, etchings and linocuts after his move to the United States in 1949. He was greatly inspired by woodblock printing in Japan as well as the woodcuts of Albrecht Dürer. Influences on his early works can be seen on his website.

Hnizdovsky printed all his woodcuts and linocuts himself at his home studio. Woodcuts and linocuts were printed on washi, which is erroneously translated as "rice paper"

Hnizdovsky's prints frequently depict flora and fauna, and there are several reasons for him largely shifting his focus from the human form. His first few years in the United States were marred by financial difficulties, language difficulties and a creative crisis. But what at first were merely substitutes for the human form. later became his most cherished subjects. He was well known in all the botanical and zoological gardens in New York, where he would find subjects willing to pose at no cost. At the Bronx Zoo, he found many models that were willing to
pose "for peanuts". Andy, the orangutan, who opened the Ape House of the Bronx Zoo when he was just a baby, was one of Hnizdovsky's favorite models. When Andy died, the Bronx Zoo immediately purchased the Hnizdovsky woodcut in remembrance of Andy. Another favorite Bronx Zoo model was the sheep. Hnizdovsky's The Sheep would become his best known print, illustrating the poster for his very successful exhibition at the Lumley Cazalet Gallery in London. This poster, incidentally, can be seen in the kitchen scene of the film The Hours.

Hnizdovsky has exhibited widely and his works are in the permanent collections of many museums worldwide. The Museum of Fine Arts in Boston has a large collection of his prints, as does the University of Mount Olive in North Carolina, which presumably has the largest collection of Hnizdovsky prints worldwide.

Hnizdovsky designed numerous book covers and illustrated many books. He also designed several postage stamps and a souvenir sheet for the Ukrainian Plast postal service (issued in 1954 and 1961).

Jacques Hnizdovsky died on November 8, 1985, in Bronxville, New York, and is buried at the Lychakivskiy Cemetery in Lviv, Ukraine. His archives are housed at the Slavic and Baltic Division of the New York Public Library.

Books illustrating the work of Hnizdovsky
 Tahir, Abe M. Jr (1987). Jacques Hnizdovsky Woodcuts and Etchings. Pelican Publishing Co.  .
 Shows all prints created during the artist's lifetime,  a catalogue raisonné, profusely illustrated with images.
 Tahir, Abe M. Jr (1975). Hnizdovsky Woodcuts 1944-1975, a Catalogue Raissonné. Pelican Publishing Co..
 Shows prints created between 1944-1975, a catalogue raisonné, profusely illustrated with images.
 Hnizdovsky, Jacques (1986). Jacques Hnizdovsky Ex Libris. S. Hnizdovsky. ASIN B0007BYZ94
 Shows 54 Ex Libris designs that the artist created for family, collectors, museums and libraries.

Publications

A partial list of books illustrated by Jacques Hnizdovsky.
The Poems of John Keats, 1964
Ukrainian Folk Tales, 1964
The Auk, the Dodo, and the Oryx, 1967
The Poems of Samuel Taylor Coleridge, 1967
Tree Trails of Central Park, 1971
Flora Exotica, 1972
The Poems of Thomas Hardy, 1979
The Traveler’s Tree, 1980
The Poetry of Robert Frost, 1981
Signum Et Verbum, 1981
A Green Place, 1982
The Violin of Monsieur Ingres, 1983
Jacques Hnizdovsky Ex Libris, 1986
Birds and Beasts, 1990
Behind the King’s Kitchen, 1992
The Girl in Glass, 2002
The Adventurous Gardener, 2005

Public collections 
Among the public collections holding works by Jacques Hnizdovsky are:

Awards
 Associated American Artists, 1959, 1962, 1964, 1965, 1970, 1972, 1974, 1975, 1979, 1982, 1983
 Ben and Beatrice Goldstein Foundation, 1973
 Boston Museum of Fine Arts, 1961
 Boston Printmakers, 1962
 Davison Art Center, Wesleyan University, 1969
 Henry Ward Ranger Award, National Academy of Design, 1963
 International Graphic Arts Society, 1964, 1969, 1970
 MacDowell Colony Fellowship, 1963, 1971, 1976
 Minneapolis Institute of Art, 1950
 Ossabaw Foundation, 1980
 Salmagundi Club Award, Audubon Artists Annual, 1975, 1982
 Tiffany Foundation Fellowship, 1961
 Virginia Center for the Creative Arts Fellowship, 1979, 1981, 1982, 1983, 1984
 Yaddo Fellowship, 1978, 1979

In November 2022, as part of a derussification campaign, Kyiv's Magnitogorsk Street was renamed to Jacques Hnizdovsky Street.

One-Man Shows

 Associated American Artists, New York NY, 1971, 1979, 1986
 Bronx Museum of the Arts, Bronx NY, 1971, 1981
 Burnaby Art Gallery, Vancouver BC, 1985
 Butler Institute of American Art, Youngstown OH, 1962
 Chapman Gallery, Canberra, Australia. 1982
 Chrysler Museum at Norfolk VA, 1967, 1968
 Creuze Gallery, Paris, 1957
 Davison Art Center, Wesleyan University, Middletown CT 1970
 Eggleston Gallery, New York NY 1954, 1958
 Emilie Walter Galleries, Vancouver BC, 1973
 Hermitage Museum and Gardens, Norfolk VA, 1981
 International Institute of Minnesota, Saint Paul MN, 1972
 Jane Haslem Gallery, Washington DC, 1982, 1984
 La Maison Francaise, NYU, New York NY, 1960
 Long Beach Museum of Art, Long Beach CA, 1977
 Lumley Cazalet Gallery, London, England, 1969, 1972, 1982
 Lviv Museum of Ukrainian Art, Lviv, Ukraine, 1990
 National Museum of Ukrainian Fine Arts, Kyiv, Ukraine, 1990
 Philadelphia Art Alliance, Philadelphia PA1961
 Pratt Institute, Brooklyn, NY, 1970
 Roberson Center for the Arts and Sciences, Binghamton, NY, 1974
 Salpeter Gallery, New York NY, 1960, 1961, 1962, 1964
 Sweet Briar College, Sweet Briar VA, 1984
 Tahir Gallery, New Orleans, 1967, 1971, 1974, 1976
 Ternopil Natural History Museum, Temopil, Ukraine, 1990
 Troup Gallery, Dallas TX, 1966, 1971
 Tryon Fine Art Center, Tryon NC, 1974
 Ukrainian Canadian Art Foundation, Toronto, ON, 1983, 1985
 Ukrainian Institute of Modern Art, Chicago IL, 1978, 1985
 University of Mount Olive, NC, 1972, 1984
 University of Virginia, Charlottesville VA, 1978, 1980, 1982, 1986
 Van Straaten Gallery, Chicago IL, 1971 (currently Denver CO)
 Virginia Center for the Creative Arts, Sweet Briar VA, 1979, 1981
 Westwood Gallery, Westwood, MA, 1973
 Winnipeg Art Gallery, Winnipeg MB, 1973
 Yale University, New Haven CT, 1977

Traveling One-Man Shows
 Burnaby Art Gallery, Burnaby BC, 1985-1986
 Fendrick Gallery, Washington DC, 1987
 United States Information Service, Kyiv, 1995-1996
 Virginia Museum of Fine Arts, Richmond VA, 1987-1992
 Winnipeg Art Gallery, Winnipeg MB, 1973

Group exhibitions
 Audubon Artists, 1975
 Boston Printmakers, 1962
 National Academy of Design, 1963, 1973, 1976, 1977, 1980
 Pratt Graphic Center, 1975-1985
 Society of American Graphic Artists, 1965-1985
 Triennale Internazionale della Xilografia, 1972
 Taipei Fine Arts Museum, Taiwan, 1983, 1985
 US Information Agencies in Europe, Asia, South America and Africa, 1963, 1965, 1967, 1968

References

Further reading
 Leshko, Jaroslaw (1995). Jacques Hnizdovsky Яків Гніздовський.
 Published by The Ukrainian Museum on the occasion of the exhibition Jacques Hnizdovsky 1915-1985: Retrospective Exhibition, organized by The Ukrainian Museum, New York. Profusely illustrated bilingual exhibition catalogue containing 23 pages of biographical text, showing examples of paintings, woodcuts, linocuts, etchings and ceramics by the artist.

External links

Jacques Hnizdovsky - Official Site
Jacques Hnizdovsky Archives
MFA Collections Database of Hnizdovsky Prints
The Jacques Hnizdovsky Collection at the University of Mount Olive
Artnet
AskArt

1915 births
1985 deaths
Modern printmakers
Woodcut designers
American etchers
20th-century American painters
American male painters
American illustrators
Realist painters
Social realist artists
20th-century Ukrainian painters
20th-century Ukrainian male artists
20th-century American male artists
Ukrainian male sculptors
Ukrainian sculptors
Ukrainian printmakers
Ukrainian etchers
Ukrainian illustrators
American people of Ukrainian descent
Ukrainian stamp designers
Burials at Lychakiv Cemetery
Ukrainian nobility
Academy of Fine Arts in Warsaw alumni
Academy of Fine Arts, University of Zagreb alumni
20th-century American printmakers
Ukrainian male painters
Polish emigrants to the United States